NHL All-Star Hockey is a video game developed by Gray Matter and published by Sega for the Sega Saturn.

Gameplay
NHL All-Star Hockey is a hockey game which features camera views, options, and video clips.

Reception
Next Generation reviewed the Saturn version of the game, rating it two stars out of five, and stated that "NHL All-Star Hockey isn't the worst hockey game ever, it's just the most disappointing."

Reviews
GameFan (Nov, 1995)
Electronic Gaming Monthly (Dec, 1995)
GamePro (Nov, 1995)
Mean Machines - Jan, 1996
Sega Saturn Magazine - Nov, 1995
Hobby Consolas - Dec, 1995
Video Games & Computer Entertainment - Nov, 1995

References

External links 
 NHL All-Star Hockey at GameFAQs
 NHL All-Star Hockey at MobyGames

1995 video games
National Hockey League video games